In geometry, two triangles are said to be orthologic if the perpendiculars from the vertices of one of them to the corresponding sides of the other are concurrent (i.e., they intersect at a single point). The points of concurrence are known as the orthology centres of the two triangles.

Some pairs of orthologic triangles
The following are some triangles associated with the reference triangle ABC and orthologic with it.
 Medial triangle
 Anticomplementary triangle
 Orthic triangle
 The triangle whose vertices are the points of contact of the incircle with the sides of ABC
 Tangential triangle
 The triangle whose vertices are the points of contacts of the excircles with the respective sides of triangle ABC
 The triangle formed by the bisectors of the external angles of triangle ABC
 The pedal triangle of any point P in the plane of triangle ABC

References

Triangle geometry